Chanekeh, Chaneque or Ohuican Chaneque, as they were called by the Aztecs, are legendary creatures in Mexican folklore. In Náhuatl, chaneque means "those who inhabit dangerous places" or the "owners of the house".  They are conceived of as small, sprite-like beings, elemental forces and guardians of nature. Similar mythical beings are common in Mesoamerican and other Latin American folkloric traditions, generally referred to in Spanish as duende. In the folkloric tradition of the Yucatán Peninsula, these elementals are known by their Yucatec Mayan name aluxob.

In some contemporary legends, chaneques are described as children with the face of old men or women, that make people go stray during three or seven days, after which the victims cannot recall anything that happened—although it is thought that they are taken by the chaneques to their home in the Underworld, also known as Mictlán or Chiconauhmictlán, through the entrance in a dry kapok tree. In other cases, these beings attack intruders, frightening them so that their soul abandons their body. If the victim does not recover their soul through a specific ritual, they become ill and die soon after.



Background 
Chaneques have a long history in Mexico, although they are represented differently based on the state. They have been found in Mesoamerican legends, as well as in documents written by the Spanish Inquisition. Scholars debate the idea that chaneques and duendes are the same mythological beings. These creatures have different names throughout the world, but they share many characteristics. The name “duende” comes from the Indo-European word dema, which means connected to the home. The root word dem- means house or household. This name stems from the fact that they tend to bother individuals in their homes.

Villagers used to give the chaneques offerings in exchange for protection. They hoped that the chaneques would protect their harvest and prevent intruders, or other evil beings, from entering their homes. Another form of protection is wearing clothing inside out if traveling in the forest.

Chaneques also had a reputation for kidnapping young men and women to have sexual relations. Historian Javier Ayala Calderon discovered an archive from 1676 in which a young man narrated his sexual experiences with a duende.

Both stories found in written text from the Spanish inquisition and oral history from Mesoamerica describe beings that tended to be naughty. Some were protective while others were hostile.

Characteristics 
La chaneques, or duendes, can be described in different ways. Chaneques have short stature and are usually described as naked. They live in forests, rivers, or caves, and are connected to the earth and water. Mexican folklore has represented them both as evil creatures who want to cause harm or good creatures who want to help. They can communicate with animals in the jungle since they provide protection. They may not always be visible to adults but children can generally see them. They like to sing, scream, and cry.

Pedro Cholotio Temo described them as "a boy doll or a little man who hops and jumps" and is seen wearing a "wide-brimmed sombrero as the Mexicans do; his color is black." Temo believes that duendes are real and connected to the devil, similar to centuries old Spanish beliefs, and that people who practice Satanic rituals are more likely to see duendes.

When angered, Chaneques can be disruptive and physically hurt humans. In one example, the Chaneque threw a fistful of hay into the mouth of a prisoner. The prisoner scares the Chaneque by saying he will create a fire.

Media Representation 

Chaneques have been represented positively and negatively in Mexican media for centuries. Mexican writer Artemio de Valle-Arizpe worked as a diplomat in Spain and spent time in the General Archive of the Indies where he discovered an interest in Mexican colonial history. He wrote many books about legends that existed during the Spanish colonial period. Stories during that time period tended to portray the legend of the chaneques with negative connotations. They were seen as creatures that worked with the devil. In Valle-Arizpe's story, Un duende y un perro (An Elf and a Dog), which takes place in the late 1500s, the creature that pesters Dona Luisa is described as a “demon”. The duende would beat her leaving her with bruises and would torment her so much that Dona Luisa lived in fear.

Mexican soap operas have depicted Chaneques in a more modern and positive perspective. Misión S.O.S is a children's television show produced by Rosy Ocampo in which a group of pre-teens living in a Mexico City neighborhood attempt to save their homes. A friendly Chaneque enters their lives and asks the children for help protecting is magical world. Through all of their adventures, the Chaneque and children bond and work to save their communities. The show depicts Chaneque as a friendly being who can be naughty and disorganized but has a good heart.

Gerardo Avila Pardo wrote La Trampa del Chaneque in which a Chaneque remembers kidnapping a small boy while his mother was cooking, while he plots the kidnapping of a small girl. The child is in the forest with her family when she sees the Chaneque and is mesmerized. The Chaneque proceeds to use telepathy to communicate with the child while her family searches for her. The story portrays the Chaneque negatively initially because of the kidnapping but in the end, the family realizes that the Chaneque did not harm the child but helped her learn about the need to protect the forest and he gave her the choice to stay in the forest or return home.

In the mexican animated film Nikté released in 2009, a chaneque called Chin works as the secondary main character during the story who is determined to save his town from the famine.

See also 

 Duende
 Alux

References

Further reading

 
Tomas Uscanga Constantino, "De Tierra y Agua: Narraciones, mitos y leyendas de Catemaco"

Aztec legendary creatures
Aztec mythology and religion
Mexican folklore
Latin American folklore
Nature spirits
Goblins